Main Naa Bhoolungi (English: I Won't Forget) is a psychological thriller television series created by writer Virendra Shahaney, It aired on Sony India Monday to Friday. The show stars Aishwarya Sakhuja in the female lead and Vikkas Manaktala in the male lead.

Plot summary
Shikha Gupta (Aishwarya Sakhuja) is a smart and independent woman. Her family is approached by Sameer Verma (Vikas Manaktala), a successful businessman who seems to be the perfect guy for her. She falls in love with him, gets married and they have a baby. Their married life was perfect. But Sameer is not who he says he is—his real name is Aditya Jagannath and as part of a bigger plan, he has staged this love and marriage to Shikha. He attempts to murder her and kidnaps their child, Manav. Shikha survives the murder attempt and embarks on a quest to reclaim her child and take revenge against Aditya. It is revealed that he is already married to a girl named Madhurima (Nigaar Khan) and that he was the one who had asked Neeraj (Avinesh Rekhi), his college friend to stalk Shikha and then save her to impress her.

Shikha changes her own self to a new person and takes a new name of Samaira Seth, who is the daughter of a businessman residing in Switzerland, Mr. Amrit Seth. Then as Samaira Seth, Shikha moves into the Jaggannath Group as their brand ambassador. She promises herself to take her son back and take revenge from Aditya. At first, he thinks that Samaira is Shikha and tells Madhu that Shikha is alive. Madhu thinks that this is rubbish and has Samaira sign the contract with Jagganath Group. Slowly, Aditya and Samaira fall in love with each other. One day, Aditya tells Samaira all about Shikha Gupta and what he did with her. Samaira starts feeling emotional, since she gets to know the truth. First, Samaira thinks that Aditya is lying, and she asks him to prove it to her that Madhu was behind this master plan. In order to gain Samaira's trust, Aditya gets Madhu drunk, and she confesses everything in front of him while Samaira is hiding. Aditya and Samaira have a plan and they send Madhu to the mental hospital. Samaira and Aditya soon get married according to Shikha's plan. Samaira brought Madhu from hospital, and she started to hurt her. Soon Neeraj also entered the Jagganath mansion as Dr. Avasthi. He starts giving Madhu medicines which would spoil her health more. Madhu finds out about Samaira's and Neeraj's plan and gets angered. So, she gets a gun and goes to where Avinash and his family are living. She threatens them that if they don't confess the truth, she will shoot any of them. Neeraj finds out and reaches when Madhu accidentally shoots Vineet. Madhu does the drama of going into coma. Aditya gets to know about Samaira's truth by watching her plastic surgery video. Aditya and Madhu secretly have a plan to kill Shikha. Avinash reveals the truth that Shikha is Samaira to the Jagganath family. Where originally Aditya and Samaira were going to kill Madhu, Aditya and Madhu surprise Samaira by telling her that they know her story and she is Shikha, they blackmail her into burying herself or they would kill her son, when they reach the place where Shikha was thrown off the cliff, Shikha is standing there, miraculously. She and Neeraj grab hold of her son and in the process while fighting with Neeraj, Aditya falls of a cliff. Meanwhile, the Jagganaths, Shikha's parents and the police arrive on the scene, and they arrest Madhu. Shikha grabs a hold of Aditya's hand but lets go, the same thing he did to her. Mr. Jagganath apologizes to Shikha on the behalf of his daughter, whom she readily forgives knowing it was not their fault. The show ended with Shikha, Neeraj and her son Maanav, walking away from the cliff, hand in hand.

Cast 
Aishwarya Sakhuja as Shikha Avinash Gupta / Samaira Seth aka Shikha Sameer Verma / Samaira Aditya Jagannath: Aditya's ex wife.
Vikkas Manaktala as Sameer Verma / Aditya Jagannath 
Nigaar Khan as Madhurima Aditya Jagannath: Aditya's wife.
Avinesh Rekhi as Neeraj Sachdeva
Bhuvan Chopra as Avinash Gupta 
Rajlaxmi Solanki as Sudha Avinash Gupta 
Pulkit Bangia as Vineet Avinash Gupta
Papiya Sengupta as Sunaina Mahanto Jagannath 
Anang Desai as Mahanto Jagannath 
Atul Kinagi as Jai Mahanto Jagannath 
Garima Jain as Arya Mahanto Jagannath

International broadcasting

References

External links 

Sony Entertainment Television original programming
Hindi-language television shows
2013 Indian television series debuts
2014 Indian television series endings
Indian drama television series
Indian television soap operas